Woodstock Express is a steel kiddie roller coaster located at California's Great America in Santa Clara, California. The coaster has slight drops and turns, and uses a lap bar for guests' safety. It was designed by Intamin and originally opened in 1984 as Scooby's Ghoster Coaster at Hanna-Barbera Land in Spring, Texas. The coaster moved to California's Great America, reopening in 1987 as Blue Streak. The coaster had a Smurfs theme when it opened within "Smurf Woods," a land featuring a Smurf village with mushroom houses. Smurf Woods was closed in the early 1990s.

Paramount Parks acquired Great America in 1993 and opened Nickelodeon Central. They gave the coaster new yellow and green seats and named it Green Slime Mine Car in 1995. One Smurf house survived and can be seen in the Picnic Grove area. In 2002, Paramount Parks repainted the coaster orange and re-themed it as Rugrats Runaway Reptar.

In 2007, Cedar Fair Entertainment Company acquired all 5 Paramount Parks (Kings Island, Canada's Wonderland, Carowinds, Kings Dominion, and California's Great America). They did not have the license to use Nickelodeon property, so Nickelodeon Central was re-themed to Planet Snoopy in 2010. Cedar Fair gave the coaster a new yellow paint job and the name Woodstock Express. Famously named after Snoopy's best pal, the coaster promises to "lend a wing" as you fly with the little yellow bird. It is also known to be a great beginner coaster for all ages. The park promises each rider to become a "coaster enthusiast for life."

Since the coaster opened in 1987, it has been re-themed at least three times.

References

 California's Great America
 Roller coasters in California
 The Smurfs in amusement parks